Houcine Bennoui (born c. 1989) is a French-Algerian Muay Thai kickboxer, younger brother of Karim Bennoui. He is the WFC World Muay Thai Champion.

Biography and career

Biography 
H. Bennoui resides in Lyon, France and trains at Gym boxing St Fons in Lyon, Saint-Fons. His trainer is Nasser Kacem. He is of Algerian heritage.

He begins Muay Thai at the age of 11, with Nasser Kacem who was a teacher in the suburbs of Lyon. His older brother, Karim Bennoui is the It's Showtime 61MAX world Champion -61 kg.

Early career 
Bennoui has had 42 fights for 35 wins (including 25 by knockout) and 7 defeats. In 2008 he became WFC World Muay Thai Champion and in 2011 he won a Muay Thai tournament (65 kg) in Brest, France.

He faced Singmanee Kaewsamrit at Thai Fight: Lyon on September 19, 2012 in Lyon, France, and won via decision after three rounds.

He was scheduled to rematch Damien Alamos at Time Fight 2 in Tours, France, on October 6, 2012 but the fight was cancelled in order for Alamos to face Diesellek Aoodonmuang.

He lost to Adaylton Pareira De Freitas via decision in the quarter-finals of the 2012 Thai Fight 67 kg Tournament at Thai Fight 2012: King of Muay Thai in Bangkok, Thailand on October 23, 2012.

Bennoui was scheduled to compete in the Krush Grand Prix 2013 ~67kg First Class Tournament~ on January 14, 2013 and fight Yuta Kubo in the quarter-finals but he pulled out of the tournament and was replaced by Roman Mailov.

He won by decision over Imwiset Pornnarai in a three-round affair at Yokkao Extreme 2013 in Milan, Italy, on January 26, 2013.

On March 9, 2013, Bennoui lost to Saenchai PKSaenchaimuaythaigym on points at Siam Warriors in Cork, Ireland.

He will fight Kaoponlek in Trieste, Italy, on July 5, 2013.

Bennoui competed at the -65 kg/143 lb Thai Max tournament in Meyreul, France, on October 19, 2013, defeating Somsak by first-round KO in the quarter-finals and Sergio Wielzen by unanimous decision in the semis before losing to Damien Alamos via TKO due to a cut in the final.

He defeated Mehdi Zatout via unanimous decision at La Ligue des Gladiateurs in Paris, France, on January 25, 2014.

Replacing Damien Alamos who withdrew with a hand injury, Bennoui lost to Liam Harrison on points in a five-round -65 kg Muay Thai bout at Yokkao 8 in Bolton, England, on March 8, 2014.

Titles and achievements
 2014 A1 WGP Tournament Champion -65 kg 
 2013 Thai Max -65 kg/143 lb Tournament Runner-up
 2011 Explosion Fight Night Volume 03 Tournament Champion (65 kg)
 2008 WFC World Muaythai Champion (-64 kg)
 2007 Junior French Muaythai Champion
 2006 Junior French Muaythai Champion

Kickboxing record

|-
|-  style="background:#fbb;"
| 2015-10-10 || Loss ||align=left| Eddy Nait Slimani || World GBC Tour 9 || Mazan, France || KO || 2 ||
|-  style="background:#cfc;"
| 2014-10-23 || Win ||align=left| Alexy Wallace || A1 WCC Lyon, Final || Lyon, France || Decision || 3 || 3:00
|-
! style=background:white colspan=9 |
|-  style="background:#cfc;"
| 2014-10-23 || Win ||align=left| Yannick Reine || A1 WCC Lyon, Semi Finals  || Lyon, France || Decision || 3 || 3:00
|-  style="background:#fbb;"
| 2014-03-08 || Loss ||align=left| Liam Harrison || Yokkao 8 || Bolton, England || Decision || 5 || 3:00
|-  style="background:#cfc;"
| 2014-01-25 || Win ||align=left| Mehdi Zatout || La Ligue des Gladiateurs || Paris, France || Decision (unanimous) || 5 || 3:00
|-  style="background:#fbb;"
| 2013-10-19 || Loss ||align=left| Damien Alamos || Thai Max, Final || Meyreuil, France || TKO (cut) || 1 || 
|-
! style=background:white colspan=9 |
|-  style="background:#cfc;"
| 2013-10-19 || Win ||align=left| Sergio Wielzen || Thai Max, Semi Finals || Meyreuil, France || Decision (unanimous) || 3 || 3:00
|-  style="background:#cfc;"
| 2013-10-19 || Win ||align=left| Somsak || Thai Max, Quarter Finals || Meyreuil, France || KO || 1 || 
|-  style="background:#fbb;"
| 2013-03-09 || Loss ||align=left| Saenchai PKSaenchaimuaythaigym || Siam Warriors || Cork, Ireland || Decision || 5 || 3:00
|-  style="background:#cfc;"
| 2013-01-26 || Win ||align=left| Imwiset Pornnarai || Yokkao Extreme 2013 || Milan, Italy || Decision (unanimous) || 3 || 3:00
|-  style="background:#fbb;"
| 2012-10-23 || Loss ||align=left| Adaylton Pareira De Freitas || Thai Fight 2012: King of Muay Thai, 67 kg Tournament Quarter Finals || Bangkok, Thailand || Decision || 3 || 3:00
|-  style="background:#cfc;"
| 2012-09-19 || Win ||align=left| Singmanee Kaewsamrit || Thai Fight: Lyon || Lyon, France || Decision || 3 || 3:00
|-  style="background:#fbb;"
| 2012-08-17 || Loss ||align=left| Singmanee Kaewsamrit || Thai Fight 2012 England || Leicester, England || Decision || 3 || 3:00
|-  style="background:#cfc;"
| 2012-06-02 || Win ||align=left| Manuel Umberti || La Nuit des Challenges 11 || Lyon, France || TKO (Gave Up) || 2 || 0:00
|-  style="background:#fbb;"
| 2011-12-00 || Loss ||align=left| Soufiane Zridy || Muaythai Gala - WAKO Pro Championship ||  || KO || 1 || 
|-
! style=background:white colspan=9 |
|-  style="background:#fbb;"
| 2011-09-25 || Loss ||align=left| Dongsu Kim || Thai Fight 2011 67 kg Tournament, Quarter Final || Bangkok, Thailand || KO || 2 || 
|-  style="background:#cfc;"
| 2011-06-04 || Win ||align=left| Olan Kaewsamrit || La Nuit des Challenges 10 || Lyon, Saint-Fons, France || KO (Lowkick) || 2 || 
|-  style="background:#cfc;"
| 2011-05-14 || Win ||align=left| Mosab Amrani || It's Showtime 2011 Lyon || Lyon, France || TKO (Gave Up) || 4 || 
|-  style="background:#cfc;"
| 2011-04-02 || Win ||align=left| Charles François || Explosion Fight Night Volume 03, Final || Brest, France || TKO || 2 || 
|-
! style=background:white colspan=9 |
|-  style="background:#cfc;"
| 2011-04-02 || Win ||align=left| Ekapol Juke || Explosion Fight Night Volume 03, Semi Final || Brest, France || KO (Liver Shot) || 2 || 
|-  style="background:#cfc;"
| 2011-02-12 || Win ||align=left| Alessio Martino || Muaythai Trophy 4 || Paris, France || KO (Flying Knee) || 1 || 
|-  style="background:#fbb;"
| 2010-10-09 || Loss ||align=left| Alessandro Campagna || K-1 Shardana || Sardinia, Italy || TKO || 1 || 
|-  style="background:#fbb;"
| 2010-04-10 || Loss ||align=left| Sudsakorn Sor Klinmee || Sherdana K-1 Gala || Sardinia, Italy || Decision || 5 || 3:00
|-  style="background:#fbb;"
| 2010-01-30 || Loss ||align=left| Anuwat Kaewsamrit || La Nuit Des Titans, Semi Final || Tours, France || Decision (Unanimous) || 3 || 3:00
|-  style="background:#fbb;"
| 2009-11-28 || Loss ||align=left| Samsamut Kiatchongkaow || A-1 World Cup Combat Lyon || Lyon, France || Decision || 5 || 3:00
|-  style="background:#cfc;"
| 2009-07-11 || Win ||align=left| Mehdi Zatout || Diamond Fight World Tour 2 || Marrakech, Morocco || TKO (Referee Stoppage) ||  || 
|-  style="background:#cfc;"
| 2009-05-16 || Win ||align=left| Damien Alamos || Légendes et Guerriers || Toulouse, France || Decision || 3 || 3:00
|-  style="background:#cfc;"
| 2009-01-30 || Win ||align=left| Riccardo Cumani || Ring-Rules || Milan, Italy || Decision || 5 || 3:00
|-  style="background:#fbb;"
| 2009-01-26 || Loss ||align=left| Ekapol Juke || Diamond Fight World Tour || Paris, France || TKO (Referee Stoppage) || 2 || 
|-
! style=background:white colspan=9 |
|-  style="background:#cfc;"
| 2009-01-10 || Win ||align=left| Sofiane Derdega || French Muaythai Championships, 1st Round || Paris, France || Decision || 5 || 3:00
|-  style="background:#cfc;"
| 2008-10-25 || Win ||align=left| Bibi Ondua || Le Choc des Best Fighters 1 || Asnières-sur-Seine, France || TKO (Doctor Stoppage) || 1 || 
|-  style="background:#cfc;"
| 2008-06-14 || Win ||align=left| Andrea Casapietra || The King of Muay Thai || Pieve Emanuele, Italy ||  ||  || 
|-
! style=background:white colspan=9 |
|-  style="background:#cfc;"
| 2008-02-24 || Win ||align=left| Nicola Massa || Tournai L1 Tournament || Tournai, Belgium || Decision || 5 || 3:00
|-
! style=background:white colspan=9 |
|-  style="background:#fbb;"
| 2007-02-17 || Loss ||align=left| Mehdi Zatout || La Nuit des Titans || Tours, France || Decision (Unanimous) || 5 || 3:00
|-  style="background:#cfc;"
| 0000-00-00 || Win ||align=left| Thomas Adamandopoulos || Kickboxing Gala || Italy || KO ||  || 
|-  style="background:#cfc;"
| 0000-00-00 || Win ||align=left| Amadou Ba || Muaythai Gala || France || KO (Highkick) || 2 || 
|-
| colspan=9 | Legend:

See also
List of male kickboxers

References

External links
Houcine Bennoui Interview

Living people
French male kickboxers
French Muay Thai practitioners
French sportspeople of Algerian descent
1989 births
Sportspeople from Lyon